Two Taverns is an unincorporated community on Pennsylvania Route 97 (Baltimore Pike) between Gettysburg and Littletown in Adams County, Pennsylvania, United States. During the Battle of Gettysburg, Kilpatrick's Union cavalry was ordered to the community prior to a charge at the South Cavalry Field.

References

American Civil War sites
Pennsylvania in the American Civil War
Unincorporated communities in Adams County, Pennsylvania
Unincorporated communities in Pennsylvania